Santana is a settlement in the southern part of the island of Santiago, Cape Verde. It is part of the municipality of Ribeira Grande de Santiago. It is situated 2 km east of Belém and 9 km northwest of Cidade Velha.

References

Villages and settlements in Santiago, Cape Verde
Ribeira Grande de Santiago